Antoshina is a Russian surname. Notable people with the surname include:

Tatiana Antoshina (born 1982), Russian cyclist
Tania Antoshina (born 1956), Russian artist

See also

Russian-language surnames